This is a list of notable Azerbaijani artists.



A 
Mikayil Abdullayev, painter
Fuad Abdurahmanov, sculptor
Sara Ashurbeyli, painter
Azim Azimzade, painter

B 
Sattar Bahlulzade, painter
Semyon Bilmes, painter

E 
Omar Eldarov, sculptor

G 
Jalal Garyaghdi, sculptor and painter
Usta Gambar Garabaghi, painter

H 
Ahad Hosseini, painter
Haydar Hatemi, painter

I 
Mirza Gadim Iravani, painter

K 
Bahruz Kangarli, painter
Latif Karimov, carpet designer
Geysar Kashiyeva, painter 
Farhad Khalilov, painter

M 
Aida Mahmudova, painter
Tokay Mammadov, painter
Shmavon Mangasarov, painter
Gunay Mehdizade, painter
Boyukagha Mirzazade, painter
Rustam Mustafayev, scenic designer

N 
Togrul Narimanbekov, painter
Vidadi Narimanbekov, painter

R 
Maral Rahmanzade, painter
Alakbar Rezaguliyev, painter
Elbey Rzaguliyev, painter

S 
Tahir Salahov, painter

See also 
 List of Azerbaijani women artists

Artists

Lists of artists by nationality